The Cat Shows Her Claws (French: La chatte sort ses griffes) is a 1960 French war drama film directed by Henri Decoin and starring Françoise Arnoul, Horst Frank and François Guérin. It was shot at the Billancourt Studios in Paris and on location around Paris including Montmartre. It is the sequel to the 1958 film The Cat about the French Resistance.

Synopsis
Cora Menessier is sentenced to death by the Resistance in 1944 for an alleged betrayal. After her execution she is left for dead, but is recovered by the Germans who brainwash her and plan to use her as a counter-agent. They release her to target a Resistance operation designed to blow up a train carrying V1s to be used to bombard London and the English coast.

Cast
 Françoise Arnoul as Cora Menessier dite La Chatte  
 Horst Frank as Major von Hollwitz  
 François Guérin as Louis  
 Harold Kay as Charles  
 Françoise Spira as Marie-José  
 Jacques Fabbri as Gustave - le chef du réseau Sud  
 Bernard La Jarrige as Dalmier dit Athos  
 Michel Jourdan as Tonio  
 Anne Tonietti as Maud  
 Chris Van Loosen as Clara  
 Gérard Darrieu as Jean-Lou  
 Jean-Pierre Zola as Un officier allemand  
 France Asselin as Madame Buisson  
 Liliane Patrick as La secrétaire de Dalmier  
 Ginette Pigeon as L'infirmière allemande  
 Anna Gaylor as Mademoiselle Lepage - l'assistante sociale  
 Albert Médina as Le patron du restaurant 
 Gabriel Gobin as Le conducteur de la locomotive 
 Jean Berton as Le cheminot résistant  
 Robert Berri as Le chauffeur du camion lors de l'accident simulé  
 Robert Le Fort as Un cheminot  
 Albert Michel as Un cheminot  
 Georges Atlas as Le barman  
 Marie Glory as La concierge 
 Werner Peters as Le général allemand

References

Bibliography 
 Maurice Bessy & Raymond Chirat. Histoire du cinéma français: 1956-1960. Pygmalion, 1990.

External links 
 

1960s war drama films
French war drama films
1960 films
1960s French-language films
Films directed by Henri Decoin
French World War II films
1960 drama films
Films scored by Joseph Kosma
Films about the French Resistance
1960s French films
French sequel films
Films shot at Billancourt Studios
Films set in Paris
Films shot in Paris